Phtheochroa osthelderi is a species of moth of the family Tortricidae. It is found in Syria and Turkey.

References

Moths described in 1989
Phtheochroa